Hillcrest School (HIS) is a private Christian K-12 educational institution that primarily serves the international community (as well as local Indonesian students) in  Sentani and Wamena, Papua, Indonesia. The student population of the school currently numbers around 200 students, approximately 80 of whom are in the high school alone. The school is fully accredited by the Western Association of Schools and Colleges and offers a standard US curriculum-based course of study. It is also a member of the East Asia Regional Council of Overseas Schools (EARCOS) and the Association of Christian Schools International (ACSI). 

Besides the regular classrooms, HIS has a K-12 library, three indoor sports facilities and a soccer field, an auditorium with kitchen facilities, outdoor lunch areas, a band room, clinic, two computer labs, two science labs, an industrial arts classroom,  two teacher resource rooms, administrative offices, and two student boarding homes. Each day has eight periods and goes for seven and a half hours, starting at 8:00am and ending at 3:00pm.  The school also has a wide variety of extra curricular sporting and musical programs.

The main campus is located on a plateau in the scenic foothills of 6000-foot Mount Cyclops, overlooking Lake Sentani, Sentani (Dortheys Hiyo Eluay) International Airport, and the town of Sentani. A satellite campus, catering to grades 1-8, is located in the interior highland town of Wamena.

Outdoor education
One of the school's trademark activities is a program known as Outdoor Education (OE). During the second semester (around April), the entire high school student body and a number of the faculty travel to a remote location somewhere in Papua. For two weeks the students and faculty serve the local people of the area by doing community service projects, hosting kids' clubs, doing community development projects, running HIV/AIDS awareness seminars, and leading worship services in local churches. The students sometimes live with the people in their traditional homes. In addition, the students are encouraged to interact with the local people and learn about their culture, history, and society. Upon their return to HIS, each student writes an anthropology paper and a journal based upon their notes and their experiences during the two weeks. Students at HIS have to complete a photo journalism project as a group as well.

Languages
Although it promotes an English-based curriculum, HIS encourages students to learn the local language of Indonesian and also offers foreign language learning opportunities as well (such as Korean & French). All students must know English well enough to communicate with the teachers and complete assigned coursework, textbook reading, and class assignments.  Enrollment acceptance is based on English ability, so fluency in English is very important, especially at the high school level.  ESL classes are offered in grades 1 through 8 to provide additional English language support.

Teachers
The school is staffed by people from all over the world who come together to serve the local community by teaching their children.  Faculty members are recruited and remunerated by the school’s sponsoring organizations. Acceptance is based on teaching qualifications and experience, and personal adherence to the school’s goals and philosophy. There are always employment opportunities at the school due to the nature of the work and the location.  There is a fairly high turnover of staff for various reasons, but there is also a strong contingent of long term staff that have served the school for upwards of 20 years each.  HIS has teachers from the USA, Canada, Australia, Malaysia, Korea, Indonesia, Germany, South Africa, England, The Netherlands, Ireland, and other countries.

Students
The students at HIS are made up of expat children (about 80 - 85%) as well as local Indonesians (about 15 - 20%) who want to be educated at an English speaking school.  The students come from all over the globe and are educated in a diverse, multicultural environment. Class sizes currently range from 10-24. This year’s HIS students come from Australia, Canada, Columbia, Germany, Indonesia, South Korea, Malaysia, Singapore, Netherlands, New Zealand,  South Africa, Japan, Papua New Guinea, Philippines, and U.S.A. Over 90% of HIS students continue on to universities in their home countries.

External links
 Official site

Schools in Western New Guinea
Education in Papua (province)
Organizations based in Papua (province)
Education in Highland Papua